The 2012 United States House of Representatives elections in Pennsylvania were held on Tuesday, November 6, 2012, to elect the 18 U.S. representatives from the state of Pennsylvania, a loss of one seat following the 2010 United States Census. The elections coincided with the elections of other federal and state offices, including a quadrennial presidential election and an election to the U.S. Senate. Primary elections were held Tuesday, April 24.

Republicans control redistricting in Pennsylvania, which lost one seat in reapportionment. A map released on December 13, 2011, effectively merged the 4th and 12th congressional districts, represented by Democrats Jason Altmire and Mark Critz. The map was passed by the Pennsylvania Senate. Critz won the incumbent-on-incumbent primary, but then lost the general election.

Overview

District 1
Pennsylvania's 1st congressional district includes primarily central and South Philadelphia, the City of Chester, the Philadelphia International Airport, and other small sections of Delaware County. It has been represented by Democrat Bob Brady since 1998.

Democratic primary

Candidates

Nominee
Bob Brady, incumbent U.S. Representative

Withdrew
Jimmie Moore, Philadelphia Municipal Court judge

Primary results

Republican primary

Candidates

Nominee
John Featherman, realtor and former candidate for mayor of Philadelphia

Primary results

General election

Endorsements

Results

District 2
Pennsylvania's 2nd congressional district includes predominantly African American sections of the city of Philadelphia--West Philadelphia, North Philadelphia, and Northwest Philadelphia—in addition to parts of South Philadelphia, Center City, and western suburbs such as Lower Merion Township in Montgomery County. It's been represented by Democrat Chaka Fattah since 1995.

Democratic primary

Candidates

Nominee
Chaka Fattah, incumbent U.S. Representative

Primary results

Republican primary

Candidates

Nominee
Robert Allen Mansfield, Jr., businessman and US Army veteran

Primary results

General election

Endorsements

Results

District 3
Pennsylvania's 3rd congressional district is located in the northwestern part of the state and includes the cities of Erie, Sharon, Hermitage, Butler and Meadville. It's been represented by Republican Mike Kelly since January 2011. He ran unopposed in the Republican primary.

Republican primary

Candidates

Nominee
Mike Kelly, incumbent U.S. Representative

Primary results

Democratic primary

Candidates

Nominee
Missa Eaton, professor and president of Democratic Women of Mercer County

Disqualified
Mel Marin
George Schroeck, attorney

Declined
Kathy Dahlkemper, former U.S. Representative
Ron DiNicola, attorney, Marine Corps veteran and nominee for Pennsylvania's 21st congressional district in 1996
Joe Sinnott, mayor of Erie

Endorsements

Primary results

General election

Endorsements

Results

District 4
Pennsylvania's 4th congressional district is located in the south-central part of the state covering all of Adams and York counties, as well as parts of Cumberland and Dauphin counties.

Republican Todd Platts, who represented Pennsylvania's 19th congressional district since 2001 and had been expected to seek re-election in the new 4th district, did not seek re-election.

Republican primary

Candidates

Nominee
Scott Perry, state representative

Eliminated in primary
Kevin Downs, businessman
Eric Martin
Chris Reilly, York County Commissioner 
Sean Summers, lawyer who represented Albert Snyder in Snyder v. Phelps 
Mark Swomley, businessman
Ted Waga, member of the York 912 Patriots

Declined
Brock McCleary, deputy political director of the National Republican Congressional Committee
Todd Platts, incumbent U.S. Representative

Primary results

Democratic primary

Candidates

Nominee
Harry Perkinson, Texas-based defense contractor employee

Eliminated in primary
Ken Lee, attorney

Withdrawn
Matt Matsunaga, businessman

Declined
Doug Hoke, York County Commissioner 
Matt Matsunaga, former co-chair of the College Republicans at Catonsville Community College 
Ryan Sanders, nominee for Pennsylvania's 19th congressional district in 2010 
John Brenner, former Mayor of York 
Eugene DePasquale, state representative (running for Auditor General)

Primary results

General election

Endorsements

Results

District 5
Pennsylvania's 5th congressional district is located in north central Pennsylvania it's the largest in area, and least densely populated, of all of Pennsylvania's congressional districts. It's been represented by Republican incumbent Glenn Thompson, who was first elected in 2008.

Republican primary

Candidates

Nominee
Glenn Thompson, incumbent U.S. Representative

Primary results

Democratic primary

Candidates

Nominee
Charles Dumas, professor at Penn State University

Primary results

General election

Endorsements

Results

District 6
Pennsylvania's 6th congressional district is located in southeastern part of the state with a combination some of very affluent suburban areas of Philadelphia and sparsely populated rural areas. It's been represented by Republican Jim Gerlach since 2003, and he ran for re-election.

Republican primary

Candidates

Nominee
Jim Gerlach, incumbent U.S. Representative

Primary results

Democratic primary

Candidates

Nominee
Manan Trivedi, physician, Iraq War veteran, and nominee for this seat in 2010

Declined
Doug Pike, candidate for this seat in 2010

Primary results

General election

Endorsements

Polling

Predictions

Results

District 7
Pennsylvania's 7th congressional district incorporates parts of the Philadelphia suburbs, including most of Delaware County along with portions of Chester County, Montgomery County, Berks County, and Lancaster County. It's been represented by Republican Pat Meehan since January 2011. He ran for re-election.

Republican primary

Candidates

Nominee
Pat Meehan, incumbent U.S. Representative

Primary results

Democratic primary

Candidates

Nominee
George Badey III, attorney

Declined
Joe Sestak, former U.S. Representative and nominee for U.S. Senate in 2010 
Jack Stollsteimer, former Safe Schools Advocate

Primary results

General election

Endorsements

Polling

Predictions

Results

District 8
Pennsylvania's 8th congressional district is located in Bucks County, along with portions of Montgomery County. It's been represented by Republican Mike Fitzpatrick since January 2011. Fitzpatrick previously represented the district from 2005 until 2007. He ran unopposed in the Republican primary.

Republican primary

Candidates

Nominee
Mike Fitzpatrick, incumbent U.S. Representative

Declined
Jennifer Stefano, activist

Primary results

Democratic primary

Candidates

Nominee
Kathy Boockvar, attorney and nominee for Commonwealth Court of Pennsylvania in 2011

Declined
Det Asinn, Doylestown Borough Council President 
Diane Marseglia, Bucks County Commissioner
Cynthia Philo, Doylestown Township Supervisor

Endorsements

Primary results

General election

Endorsements

Predictions

Results

District 9
Pennsylvania's 9th congressional district is located in the South Western part of the state. Redistricting added majority-Democratic Fayette County as well as some of the Democratic portions of Washington, Greene, Cambria and Westmoreland Counties. It's been represented by Republican Bill Shuster since 2001. He ran for re-election.

Republican primary

Candidates

Nominee
Bill Shuster, incumbent U.S. Representative

Disqualified
Travis Schooley, businessman

Primary results

Democratic primary
Karen Ramsburg, a nurse from Mercersburg, had been running as an Independent, but after no Democrat filed to run, she mounted a write-in campaign for the April primary. She was successful, receiving enough write-in votes to receive the Democratic nomination.

Candidates

Nominee
Karen Ramsburg, nurse

General election

Endorsements

Results

District 10
Pennsylvania's 10th congressional district is located in the central and northeast regions of the state. It's been represented by Republican Tom Marino since January 2011. He ran for re-election.

Republican primary

Candidates

Nominee
Tom Marino, incumbent U.S. Representative

Primary results

Democratic primary

Candidates

Nominee
Philip Scollo, businessman

Declined
Chris Carney, former U.S. Representative

Primary results

General election

Endorsements

Polling

Results

District 11
Pennsylvania's 11th congressional district stretches from the Poconos all the way to the suburbs of Harrisburg. It's been represented by Republican Lou Barletta since January 2011.

Republican primary

Candidates

Nominee
Lou Barletta, incumbent U.S. Representative

Primary results

Democratic primary

Candidates

Nominee
Gene Stilp, activist, candidate for Lieutenant Governor in 2006, and candidate for state representative in 2010

Eliminated in primary
William Vinsko, lawyer and assistant Wilkes-Barre city attorney

Declined
Chris Doherty, mayor of Scranton 
Paul Kanjorski, former U.S. Representative
Michael Lombardo, former mayor of Pittston 
Corey O'Brien, Lackawanna County Commissioner and candidate for this seat in 2010

Endorsements

Primary results

General election

Endorsements

Predictions

Results

District 12
Pennsylvania's 12th congressional district is located in southwestern Pennsylvania, and consists of all of Beaver County, and parts of Allegheny, Cambria, Lawrence, Somerset, and Westmoreland counties. Democrats Mark Critz, who represented Pennsylvania's 12th congressional district since 2010; and Jason Altmire, who represented Pennsylvania's 4th congressional district since 2007, both sought re-election in the new 12th district.

Democratic primary

Candidates

Nominee
Mark Critz, incumbent U.S. Representative

Eliminated in primary
Jason Altmire, incumbent U.S. Representative for Pennsylvania's 4th congressional district

Endorsements

Polling

Primary results

Republican primary

Candidates

Nominee
Keith Rothfus, attorney and nominee for Pennsylvania's 4th congressional district in 2010

Declined
Jim Christiana, state representative 
Mike Turzai, majority leader of the Pennsylvania House of Representatives

Primary results

General election

Endorsements

Polling

Predictions

Results

District 13
Pennsylvania's 13th congressional district is located in Southeastern Pennsylvania, covering eastern Montgomery County and Northeast Philadelphia. Democrat Allyson Schwartz, who represented Pennsylvania's 13th congressional district since 2005, sought re-election.

Democratic primary

Candidates

Nominee
Allyson Schwartz, incumbent U.S. Representative

Declined
Nathan Kleinman, member of the Occupy Philadelphia movement and field organizer for Barack Obama's 2008 presidential campaign

Endorsements

Primary results

Republican primary

Candidates

Nominee
Joseph Rooney, pilot and Marine Corps veteran

Primary results

General election

Endorsements

Results

District 14
Pennsylvania's 14th congressional district includes the entire city of Pittsburgh and parts of surrounding suburbs. Incumbent Democrat Mike Doyle defeated challenger Janis C. Brooks in the Democratic primary. He faced Republican Hans Lessmann in the general election.

Democratic primary

Candidates

Nominee
Mike Doyle, incumbent U.S. Representative

Eliminated in primary
Janis C. Brooks, pastor and nonprofit founder

Endorsements

Primary results

Republican primary

Candidates

Nominee
Hans Lessmann, optometrist

Primary results

General election

Endorsements

Results

District 15
Pennsylvania's 15th congressional district is located in eastern Pennsylvania and stretches from the suburbs east of Harrisburg to communities east of Allentown to the New Jersey border. Counties located in the district include all of Lehigh County and parts of Berks County, Dauphin County, Lebanon County, and Northampton County. It's been represented by Republican Charlie Dent since 2005. He ran for re-election.

Republican primary

Candidates

Nominee
Charlie Dent, incumbent U.S. Representative

Primary results

Democratic primary

Candidates

Nominee
Rick Daugherty, chairman of the Lehigh County Democratic Party

Eliminated in primary
Jackson Eaton, Army veteran

Declined
John Callahan, mayor of Bethlehem and nominee for this seat in 2010

Endorsements

Primary results

General election

Endorsements

Predictions

Results

District 16
Pennsylvania's 16th congressional district is located in the southeastern part of the state, just west of Philadelphia. The district is composed of a large portion of southern Chester County, most of Lancaster County, and a sliver of Berks County, including the city of Reading. Incumbent Republican Joe Pitts, who represented the district since 1997, faced Democrat Aryanna C. Strader. They each ran unopposed in their respective primaries.

Republican primary

Candidates

Nominee
Joe Pitts, incumbent U.S. Representative

Primary results

Democratic primary

Candidates

Nominee
Aryanna Strader, business owner

Primary results

General election

Endorsements

Results

District 17
Pennsylvania's 17th congressional district is located in the eastern part of the state. The district encompasses Schuylkill County and portions of Carbon, Monroe, Luzerne, Lackawanna, and Northampton counties. Democrat Tim Holden, who represented Pennsylvania's 17th congressional district since 2003, ran for re-election. Pennsylvania Republicans, who controlled the redistricting process after the 2010 United States Census, drew this district to be much more Democratic, taking in parts of Scranton and Wilkes Barre.

Democratic primary
Holden, a Blue Dog Democrat who had represented a very Republican district for 10 years, was considered vulnerable to a primary challenge due to the bluer hue of the new district. Holden was defeated in the Democratic primary by attorney Matt Cartwright, 57–43. Holden's opposition to the Patient Protection and Affordable Care Act and climate change legislation are believed to have contributed to his defeat by a more liberal opponent.

Candidates

Nominee
Matt Cartwright, attorney

Eliminated in primary
Tim Holden, incumbent U.S. Representative

Declined
Corey O'Brien, Member of the Lackawanna County Board of Commissioners and candidate for Pennsylvania's 11th congressional district in 2010

Endorsements

Primary results

Republican primary

Candidates

Nominee
Laureen Cummings, Tea Party activist

Primary results

General election

Endorsements

Results

District 18
Pennsylvania's 18th congressional district is concentrated in the southern suburbs of Pittsburgh and includes parts of Greene County, Washington County, Allegheny County, and Westmoreland County. Republican Tim Murphy, who represented Pennsylvania's 18th congressional district since 2003, successfully sought re-election.

Republican primary

Candidates

Nominee
Tim Murphy, incumbent U.S. Representative

Eliminated in primary
Evan Feinberg, former aide to U.S. Senators Tom Coburn and Rand Paul

Endorsements

Primary results

Democratic primary

Candidates

Nominee
Larry Maggi, Washington County Commissioner

Declined
Ralph Kaiser, former state representative

Primary results

General election

Endorsements

Predictions

Results

References

External links
Pennsylvania Secretary of State
Official election results
United States House of Representatives elections in Pennsylvania, 2012 at Ballotpedia
Pennsylvania U.S. House from OurCampaigns.com
Campaign contributions for U.S. Congressional races in Pennsylvania from OpenSecrets
Outside spending at the Sunlight Foundation

United States House of Representatives
Pennsylvania
2012